The Nauru Police Force is the national police force of the Republic of Nauru.

History
The force was established through the Nauru Police Force Act of 26 January in 1972, which has been amended several times.

Structure 

The NPF is divided into six units.
 Professional Standards Unit 
 Operations Unit
 Crimes Unit
 Learning and Development Unit
 Operations Support Unit
 Maritime Unit
The Nauru Police Force has the following ranks, modeled after the Australian Federal Police:
 cadet constable
 constable
 director
 inspector
 non-commissioned officer
 police officer
 reserve officer

Weapons 
Police officers in Nauru are not armed while on routine patrol, although as of 2018 the police was estimated to possess 60 firearms. In 2020, 30 M1 Garand Honor Guard (or Squad Performance) rifles were donated by the Taiwanese Embassy to the Nauru Police Force.

Vehicles

References

External links 

Law enforcement agencies in Oceania
Nauru